Chloride transport protein 6 is a protein that in humans is encoded by the CLCN6 gene.

The CLCN family of voltage-dependent chloride channel genes comprises nine members (CLCN1-7, Ka and Kb) which demonstrate quite diverse functional characteristics while sharing significant sequence homology. Chloride channel 6 and 7 belong to a subbranch of this family. Chloride channel 6 has four different alternatively spliced transcript variants. This gene is in close vicinity to two other kidney-specific chloride channel genes, CLCNKA and CLCNKB.

See also
 Chloride channel

References

Further reading

External links
 
 

Ion channels